The NS-23 was a  aircraft cannon designed by A. E. Nudelman, A. Suranov, G. Zhirnykh, V. Nemenov, S. Lunin, and M. Bundin during World War II as a replacement for the Volkov-Yartsev VYa-23 cannon. It entered service in 1944. The NS-23 round was derived from the 14.5×114mm anti-tank round by necking it out to 23 mm.

A synchronized version, designated NS-23S (for synchronized), was used for fixed installations firing through the propeller arc.

Applications of the NS-23 included the Antonov An-2, Ilyushin Il-10, Ilyushin Il-22, Lavochkin La-9, La-15, MiG-9, Yak-9UT, Yak-15, Yak-17, Yak-23, and Tu-4. Some early MiG-15s were also equipped with the NS-23.

The NS-23 was replaced in service by the Nudelman-Rikhter NR-23 around 1949.

References

External links

 The NS-23 on airpages.ru

Autocannons of the Soviet Union
Aircraft guns of the Soviet Union
23 mm artillery
Weapons and ammunition introduced in 1944